Seymour is an English toponymic surname of Norman origin (de Saint-Maur). Notable individuals with this surname include: 

A. J. Seymour (1914–1989), Guyanese  poet, essayist, memoirist and editor
Alan Seymour (1927–2015), Australian playwright and writer
Algernon Seymour (disambiguation)
Archibald Seymour, 13th Duke of Somerset (1810–1891)
Beauchamp Seymour, 1st Baron Alcester (1821–1895), British admiral
Benjamin Seymour (c. 1806–1880), Canadian politician
Brett Seymour (born 1984), Australian rugby league player
Cara Seymour, English actress
Carolyn Seymour (born 1947), English actress
Charles Seymour (disambiguation)
Cy Seymour (1872–1919), American Major League Baseball player
David Seymour (disambiguation)
Edward Seymour (disambiguation)
Elizabeth Seymour (disambiguation)
 Eliza Seymour Lee (1800–1874), American pastry chef and restaurateur
 Eleanor Seymour (born in 2003) British artist and writer 
Evelyn Seymour, 17th Duke of Somerset (1882–1954)
Felipe Seymour (born 1987), Chilean football player
Forrest W. Seymour (1905–1983), American journalist
Frances Seymour (disambiguation)
Francis Seymour (disambiguation)
Frederick Seymour (1820–1869), Irish-born colonial administrator, Governor of the Colony of British Columbia
George Seymour (disambiguation)
Gerald Seymour (born 1941), British writer
Gordon Seymour, pseudonym of Charles Waldstein (1856–1927), Anglo-American archaeologist and short story writer
Henry Seymour (disambiguation)
Hezekiah C. Seymour (1811–1853), American civil engineer, New York State Engineer and Surveyor
Horatio Seymour (disambiguation)
Hugh Seymour (disambiguation)
James Seymour (disambiguation)
Jane Seymour (disambiguation)
John Seymour (disambiguation)
Katie Seymour (1870–1903), British burlesque and vaudeville entertainer
Kelly Seymour (born 1936), South African cricketer
Ken Seymour (born 1930), Australian rules footballer
Kevon Seymour (born 1993), American football player
Lynn Seymour (born 1939), Canadian ballerina and choreographer
Mark Seymour (born 1956), Australian musician
Mark Seymour (1897–1952), English golfer
Mary Seymour (1548–1550?), daughter of Catherine Parr and Thomas, 1st Baron Seymour of Sudeley
Mary Foot Seymour (1846–1893), American law reporter, business woman, school founder, journalist
Matthew Seymour (1669–1735), member of the Connecticut House of Representatives from Norwalk, Connecticut, and founding settler of Ridgefield, Connecticut
Michel Seymour (born 1954), Canadian philosopher and professor
Michael Seymour (disambiguation)
Miranda Seymour (born 1948), English literary critic, novelist, and biographer
Nick Seymour (born 1958), Australian bass guitarist
Paul Seymour (American football) (born 1950), American footballer
Paul Seymour (mathematician) (born 1950), mathematician
Paul Seymour (basketball) (1928–1988), American basketball player and coach
Percy Seymour, 18th Duke of Somerset (1910–1984)
Phil Seymour (1952–1993), American power pop musician
Phil Seymour (American football) (1947–2013), American football player
Richard Seymour (born 1979), former American National Football League player
Richard Seymour (18th-century writer) (died c.1750), English editor and author
Richard Seymour (21st-century writer) (born 1977), British Marxist writer
Ruth Seymour, American retired public radio station manager
Ryan Seymour (born 1990), American National Football League player
Sally Seymour (died 1824), American pastry chef and restaurateur
Sebastian Seymour, Lord Seymour (born 1982), heir apparent to the title of Duke of Somerset
Silas Seymour (1817–1890), American engineer, New York State Engineer and Surveyor
Silas J. Seymour (1824–?), American politician
Stephanie Kulp Seymour (born 1940), U.S. court of appeals judge
Stephanie Seymour (born 1968), supermodel
Terri Seymour (born 1973), British television presenter and sometime actress
Thaddeus Seymour (1928–2019), American educator
Thomas Seymour (disambiguation)
Truman Seymour (1824–1891), American Civil War general and painter
Webb Seymour, 10th Duke of Somerset (1718–1793)
Whitney North Seymour (1901–1983), American lawyer
Whitney North Seymour Jr. (1923–2019), American politician
William Seymour (disambiguation)

See also
Seymour-Conway (disambiguation), a list of people with the surname
Elizabeth Handley-Seymour (c. 1873–1948), English fashion designer
Martin Seymour-Smith, English writer
 Thomas Seamer (1632–1712), founding settler of Norwalk, Connecticut

English-language surnames